103.9 Radyo Natin (DYRR 103.9 MHz) is an FM station owned and operated by Manila Broadcasting Company. Its studios and transmitter are located at Pinamungajan.

References

External links
Radyo Natin Pinamungajan FB Page

Radyo Natin Network stations
Radio stations in Cebu
Radio stations established in 1997